The Catholic Church in Nigeria is part of the worldwide Catholic Church, under the spiritual leadership of the Pope, the curia in Rome, and the Catholic Bishops' Conference of Nigeria (CBCN). The present president of the CBCN  is Most Rev. Lucius Ugorji,, Archbishop of Owerri, who was preceded by the Archbishop of Benin city Catholic Diocese, Augustine Obiora Akubeze .

The Latin and Eastern Catholic Churches comprise the world's largest Christian Church, and its largest religious grouping. In 2005, there were an estimated 19 million baptised Catholics in Nigeria. In 2010 the Catholic population accounted for approximately 12.6% of the population.

Nigeria, together with Congo Democratic Republic, boasts of the highest number of priests in Africa.  The boom in vocation to the priesthood in Nigeria is mainly in the eastern part (especially among the Igbo ethnic group) which accounts for over 70 percent of the country's Catholic population.

The second papal visit to the country in 1998 witnessed the beatification of Blessed Cyprian Michael Iwene Tansi. Pope John Paul II proclaimed him blessed at Oba, Onitsha Archdiocese, a local Church established by the apostle of eastern Nigerian, Bishop Joseph Shanahan, CSSp.

The official patron saints of Nigeria are: Mary, Queen of Nigeria and Saint Patrick of Ireland.

List of dioceses

Within Nigeria the hierarchy consists of:
Archbishopric
Bishopric

Abuja (Cardinal Archbishop)
Gboko
 Idah
Katsina-Ala
 Lafia
 Lokoja
 Makurdi
 Otukpo
Benin City
 Auchi
 Bomadi
 Issele-Uku
 Uromi
 Warri

Calabar
 Ikot Ekpene
 Ogoja
 Port Harcourt
 Uyo
Ibadan
 Ekiti
 Ilorin
 Ondo
 Osogbo
 Oyo

Jos
 Bauchi
 Jalingo
 Maiduguri
 Pankshin
 Shendam
 Yola
Kaduna
 Kafanchan
 Kano
 Kontagora
 Minna
 Sokoto
 Zaria

Lagos (Cardinal Archbishop)
 Abeokuta
 Ijebu-Ode
Onitsha
 Abakaliki
 Awgu
 Awka
 Ekwulobia
 Enugu
 Nnewi
 Nsukka

Owerri
 Aba
 Ahiara
 Okigwe
 Orlu
 Umuahia

Immediately subject to the Holy See:
Maronite Catholic Eparchy of the Annunciation

Episcopal conference
The Catholic Bishops' Conference of Nigeria is the Nigerian episcopal conference. Its current President is Archbishop of Owerri Most Rev. Lucius Ugorji,.

Catholic traditionalism 
A more traditionalist subset of the Catholic Church is also present in Nigeria and embodied by the Priestly Fraternity of St. Peter (Nne Enyemaka Shrine, Umuaka). There also exists a community of the irregular status Society of St. Pius X (Saint Michael's Priory, Enugu).

Catholic universities in Nigeria
Caritas University, Amorji-Nike
Godfrey Okoye University, Enugu
Madonna University (Ihiala), Okija
Our Saviour Institute of Science and Technology, Enugu
VUNA, Veritas University Abuja (The Catholic University of Nigeria), Abuja
Augustine University Ilara
Pan-Atlantic University, Lagos

Major seminaries in Nigeria
Seminary of Saints Peter and Paul, Ibadan, Oyo State, Nigeria
Seminary of All Saints, Uhiele Ekpoma, Edo State, Nigeria
Bigard Memorial Seminary, Enugu
St. Thomas Aquinas Major Seminary, Makurdi
 St. Augustine's Major Seminary, Jos
National Missionary Seminary of St. Paul, Gwagwalada
 St Joseph Major Seminary Ikot Ekpene
 Blessed Tansi Major Seminary Onitsha, Anambra State
 St Albert The Great Major Seminary Abeokuta
 St. John of the Cross Spiritual Year Seminary, Ekpoma
 Seat of Wisdom Major Seminary, Owerri
 Seat of Wisdom Major Seminary, Umuahia Campus
 JohnPaul II Major Seminary, Awka
 Good Shepherd Major Seminary, Kaduna
 Claretian Institute of Philosophy, Nekede Owerri
 Spiritan Institute of Theology Attakwu Enugu
 Spiritan Institute of Philosophy, Isienu Nsukka
 Don Bosco Institute of Philosophy Affiliated to Salesian Pontifical University (Rome)
 Dominican Institute

Minor seminaries in Nigeria
 St. Augustine's seminary, Amechi Ezzamgbo, Abakaliki, Ebonyi State 
 Queen of Apostles Seminary, Afaha Obong, Abak, Akwa Ibom State
 Immaculate Conception Seminary, Mfamosing, Cross River State
 St. John Vianney Minor Seminary, Barkin-Ladi, Plateau State
 St. James' Junior Seminary, Yandev Gboko
 St. Jude's Minor Seminary, Kuje Abuja
 St Theresa's Minor Seminary Oke-Are Ibadan
 Sacred Hearts Minor Seminary Akure
 St. Clement's Minor Seminary, Adankolo-Lokoja, Kogi State
 St Paul's Seminary Ukpor, Nnewi Anambra State
 All Hallows Seminary, Onitsha Anambra State
 St Joseph's Seminary Special Science School, Awka-Etiti Anambra State. 
 Mercy Seminary, Bende Abia State
 Immaculate Conception Seminary, Ahiaeke Umuahia, Abia State
 St. Dominic Savio Seminary, Akpu, Anambra State
 St John Bosco Seminary, Isuaniocha, Anambra State
 Holy Martyrs of Uganda seminary Effurun, Delta State
 Annunciation Seminary Amaudara, Abia State
 St John-cross minor seminary, Isienu-Nsukka, Enugu state
 St Charles Borromeo seminary, Imiringi, Bayelsa State.
 St Mary's Seminary Umuowa, Orlu, Imo State.
Bonus Pastor Seminary Osina, Ideato North, Imo State.
Assumpta Minor Seminary, Owerri Archdiocese.
 Mater Ecclesiae Seminary, Nguru Mbaise, Ahiara Diocese
 St Peter Claver's Seminary Okpala Owerri Archdiocese
 Pope John Paul II Seminary Yala Okpoma Ogoja Diocese
 St. Peter's Seminary Ogii, Okigwe Diocese
 Sacred Heart Seminary, Rumuebiekwe Port Hacourt, Port hacourt Diocese
 St. Felix Seminary Ejeme-Anigor, Delta State
 St. Joseph Seminary Basawa, Zaria, Kaduna State.
 St. Charles Borromeo Minor Seminary, Madakiya Kaduna State
 St Peter's Minor Seminary, Katari Kaduna State
 St Peter's Minor Seminary, Yola Adamawa State
 St Joseph's Minor Seminary, Shuwa Adamawa State
 Sacred Heart  Minor Seminary, Jauro Yinu Taraba State
 St. Paul Minor Seminary, Benin City, Edo State

Nigerians who have been canonized or beatified
 Blessed Cyprian Michael Iwene Tansi, from Anambra State Beatified by Pope John Paul II, 22 March 1998

Catholic religious congregations founded in Nigeria
Daughters of Divine Love
New Evangelization Sisters of Mother of Perpetual Help)
Sons of Mary, Mother of Mercy Congregation
Daughters of Mary, Mother of Mercy Congregation
Holy Family Sisters of the Needy
Missionary Sisters of Divine Mercy, Nnewi, Nigeria. Website: www.divinemercysisters.net
Sisters of the Eucharistic Heart of Jesus, Ikeja, Lagos-State.
Sisters of Jesus Crucified, Uratta, Owerri, Imo State
Missionary sister of Jesus and Mary, Warri

Missionary societies active in Nigeria

The Spiritans (Congregation of the Holy Spirit, C.S.Sp.)
The Augustinians (Order of Saint Augustine, O.S.A.)
Missionary Sisters of Our Lady of Apostles
St. Louis Sisters
Salesians of Don Bosco Salesians of Don Bosco (SDB)]
Missionaries of Africa
Pontifical Mission Societies of Nigeria (PMS Nigeria)
Aid to the Church in Need
 Missionary Society of St. Paul
 Order of Preachers (Dominicans)
 Order of Discalced Carmelites
 The Franciscans
 Society of Jesus (Jesuits)
 The Cleratian Missionary Fathers
 The Oblates Of St Joseph 
 The Redemptorists
 The Society of Divine Vocations (Vocationists) 
Daughters of St Paul
 (Missionary Sisters of Divine Mercy P. O. Box 611 Nnewi Nigeria. Cell: +2348033802674)
Oblates of the Virgin Mary
Missionary Oblates of Mary Immaculate - Website: www.omiworld.org

See also
List of Catholic dioceses in Nigeria This page also gives quick access to many internet links to official websites of the Nigerian dioceses.
List of cathedrals in Nigeria
List of saints from Africa

References

External links
Catholic Secretariat of Nigeria
Catholic Bishops' Conference of Nigeria
Catholic News Service of Nigeria
GCatholic.org Information
Catholic Hierarchy Alphabetical list of Nigeria dioceses
Catholic-Hierarchy Nigeria Statistical Table by Diocese\
Catholic C.H.E.S.S. Project (Catholic Home, Education and Social Support)
"Agencia Fides" Information Service of the Pontifical Mission Societies since 1927

 
Nigeria
Nigeria